The Royal Institute for Cultural Heritage (KIK-IRPA, for Koninklijk Instituut voor het Kunstpatrimonium - Institut Royal du Patrimoine Artistique) is a Belgian federal institute of the Belgian Federal Science Policy Office (BELSPO). The institute studies and conserves the artistic and cultural assets of Belgium. Its mission consists in research and public service. The personnel of the institute consists of conservator-restorers, historians of art, photographers, chemists, physicists and many other scientists. Hilde De Clercq is the General Director of the institute.

History
Its founder and first director was Paul B. Coremans (1908-1965). In 1957 the ACL becomes one of the ten national scientific institutions under the name Royal Institute for Cultural Heritage (KIK-IRPA). The building of the institute, finished in 1963, was the first in the world specially designed to promote the interdisciplinary approach to works of art. The building was designed by architect Charles Rimanque based on an initial technical concept by René Sneyers.

Departments
The institute consists of three departments:
 Documentation: inventory and photography studio, databases, valorization and communication
 Laboratories: materials and technics, research on methodology of conservation and maintenance of monuments
 Conservation and restoration: paintings, sculptures and art industry

Online artworks pages
In the images database BALaT, each artwork is assigned a record number. To reference an artwork page directly, use the code listed at the bottom of the record, usually of the form: http://balat.kikirpa.be/object/ followed by the artwork's record number. For example, the artwork record number for the Ghent Altarpiece is 21, so its BALaT artwork page can be referenced as http://balat.kikirpa.be/object/21.

See also
 Cultural heritage
 Culture of Belgium

References

 History of the institute

External links 

 
 Royal Institute for Cultural Heritage on BALaT - Belgian Art Links and Tools

1948 establishments in Belgium
Heritage organizations in Belgium
History organisations based in Belgium
Open-access archives
Organisations based in Belgium with royal patronage
Science and technology in Belgium